Emomo Eddy Ngoy (born 13 October 1993) is a Congolese international footballer who plays as a striker for Wolkite City F.C. in Ethiopia. He made his international début in 2012.

He was named in the Congolese squad for the 2013 African Youth Championship and for the 2014 African Nations Championship.

References 

1993 births
Democratic Republic of the Congo footballers
AS Vita Club players
US Monastir (football) players
Democratic Republic of the Congo international footballers
Living people
Association football forwards
Sharks XI FC players
21st-century Democratic Republic of the Congo people
Democratic Republic of the Congo A' international footballers
2014 African Nations Championship players
Democratic Republic of the Congo expatriate footballers
Expatriate footballers in Oman
Expatriate footballers in Ethiopia
Expatriate footballers in Tunisia
Expatriate footballers in Egypt
Democratic Republic of the Congo expatriate sportspeople in Oman
Democratic Republic of the Congo expatriate sportspeople in Ethiopia
Democratic Republic of the Congo expatriate sportspeople in Tunisia
Democratic Republic of the Congo expatriate sportspeople in Egypt